Matthildur Þorsteinsdóttir (born 8 April 1997) is an Icelandic Paralympic track and field athlete, competing mainly in sprint races and the long jump. In 2012 she was nominated to participate in the 2012 Summer Paralympics in London. She placed 8th in the women's long jump F37/38. At the 2012 IPC Athletics European Championships she won a bronze medal in the Women's long jump F 37 class.

References

External links 
 

1997 births
Living people
Matthildur Thorsteinsdottir
Athletes (track and field) at the 2012 Summer Paralympics